The International Divine Science Association was founded in 1892 in San Francisco, California by religious leader and author Malinda Cramer. The association was "founded for the promulgation of Divine Science, the God idea of perfect unity, harmony and wholeness, associated together in a unity of spirit, for the healing of nations, and the general good of humanity."

The International Divine Science Association hosted several New Thought Congresses through the 1890s. The association was a loose coalition of Divine Science leaders and centers across the United States, and is credited as the first of several umbrella organizations created at the turn of the 20th century for the New Thought movement.

Bibliography 

 Satter, B. (2001) Each Mind a Kingdom: American Women, Sexual Purity, and the New Thought Movement, 1875–1920. University of California Press. p 106–110.

References 

Divine Science
Religious organizations established in 1892
New Thought organizations
Religious organizations based in the United States
Churches in California
Religion in the San Francisco Bay Area
Organizations based in San Francisco
1892 establishments in California